Mallecolobus is a genus of Chilean araneomorph spiders in the family Orsolobidae, and was first described by Raymond Robert Forster & Norman I. Platnick in 1985.

Species
 it contains four species, found only in Chile:
Mallecolobus malacus Forster & Platnick, 1985 (type) – Chile
Mallecolobus maullin Forster & Platnick, 1985 – Chile
Mallecolobus pedrus Forster & Platnick, 1985 – Chile
Mallecolobus sanus Forster & Platnick, 1985 – Chile

See also
 List of Orsolobidae species

References

Araneomorphae genera
Orsolobidae
Spiders of South America
Taxa named by Raymond Robert Forster
Endemic fauna of Chile